Hiram Jerome Ball (November 9, 1832 – December 16, 1908) was an American politician and farmer.

Born in Hanover, Chautauqua County, New York, Ball moved to Wisconsin Territory in 1846. In 1859, Ball moved to California and then moved back to Jefferson County, Wisconsin in 1862. He was a farmer and lived in Palmyra, Wisconsin. In 1871 and in 1878, Ball served in the Wisconsin State Assembly and was a Democrat. Ball lived in San Jose, California from 1883 until his death in 1908. Ball died from heart failure at his home in San Jose, California.

Notes

1832 births
1908 deaths
People from Chautauqua County, New York
People from Palmyra, Wisconsin
Politicians from San Jose, California
Farmers from Wisconsin
19th-century American politicians
Democratic Party members of the Wisconsin State Assembly